A maculopathy is any pathological condition of the macula, an area at the centre of the retina that is associated with highly sensitive, accurate vision.

Forms of maculopathies

Age-Related Macular Degeneration is a degenerative maculopathy associated with progressive sight loss. It is characterised by changes in pigmentation in the Retinal Pigment Epithelium, the appearance of drusen on the retina of the eye and choroidal neovascularization. AMD has two forms; 'dry' or atrophic/non-exudative AMD, and 'wet' or exudative/neovascular AMD.
Malattia Leventinese (or Doyne’s honeycomb retinal dystrophy) is another maculopathy with a similar pathology to wet AMD.
Hypotony maculopathy: Maculopathy due to very low intraocular pressure (ocular hypotony).
Cellophane Maculopathy A fine glistening membrane forms over the macula, obscuring the vision.

See also
EFEMP1 - a gene thought to be involved with Malattia Leventinese
Robert Walter Doyne - the British Ophthalmologist after whom Malattia Leventinese is named
Age-Related Macular Degeneration
Retinitis Pigmentosa
Malattia Leventinese

References

Eye diseases
Channelopathies
Blindness